Hassan Haji Mohamoud, also known as Hassan Gadhweyneh, is a Somali politician, the longest serving Minister of Education of Somaliland (2003-2010), the Mayor of Berbera (1998-2003), Governor of Sahil region of Somaliland from (1998-2003). He also served as the Deputy-Mayor of Mogadishu from (1975-1991).

References 

Living people
United Peoples' Democratic Party politicians
Mayors of places in Somaliland
Education Ministers of Somaliland
Governors of Sahil
People from Maroodi Jeex
1946 births
Issa Musa